Kiss Me, Kate is a musical written by Bella and Samuel Spewack with music and lyrics by Cole Porter. The story involves the production of a musical version of William Shakespeare's The Taming of the Shrew and the conflict on and off-stage between Fred Graham, the show's director, producer, and star, and his leading lady, his ex-wife Lilli Vanessi. A secondary romance concerns Lois Lane, the actress playing Bianca, and her gambler boyfriend, Bill, who runs afoul of some gangsters. The original production starred Alfred Drake, Patricia Morison, Lisa Kirk and Harold Lang.

Kiss Me, Kate was Porter's response to Rodgers and Hammerstein's Oklahoma! and other integrated musicals; it was the first show he wrote in which the music and lyrics were firmly connected to the script. The musical premiered in 1948 and proved to be Porter's only show to run for more than 1,000 performances on  Broadway. In 1949, it won the first Tony Award for Best Musical.

Inspiration
The musical was inspired by the on-stage/off-stage battling of husband-and-wife actors Alfred Lunt and Lynn Fontanne during their 1935 production of The Taming of the Shrew, witnessed by future Broadway producer Arnold Saint-Subber. In 1947, he asked the Spewacks (undergoing their own marital woes at the time) to write the script; Bella Spewack in turn enlisted Cole Porter to write the music and lyrics.

Productions

Original Broadway production
After a 3½-week pre-Broadway tryout at the Shubert Theatre in Philadelphia starting December 2, 1948, the original Broadway production opened on December 30, 1948, at the New Century Theatre, where it ran for nineteen months before transferring to the Shubert, for a total run of 1,077 performances. Directed by John C. Wilson with choreography by Hanya Holm, the original cast included Alfred Drake, Patricia Morison, Lisa Kirk, Harold Lang, Charles Wood and Harry Clark. The 1949 original cast recording has been inducted into the Library of Congress's National Recording Registry for the album's "cultural, artistic and/or historical significance to American society and the nation's audio legacy".

Original London and Australian productions
The original West End production opened on March 8, 1951, at the Coliseum Theatre, and ran for 400 performances. Directed by Sam Spewack with choreography again by Holm, this production starred Patricia Morison, Bill Johnson, Adelaide Hall and Julie Wilson.

The original Australian production played from February 1952 at His Majesty's Theatre, Melbourne, before seasons in Sydney, Brisbane, Perth and Adelaide until 1954. The production featured Hayes Gordon and Joy Turpin (later replaced by Evie Hayes).

1970 London and 1987 UK revivals
A London revival opened in December 1970 at the London Coliseum, in a production by the Sadler's Wells Opera. The cast featured Emile Belcourt (Petruchio), Judith Bruce, Eric Shilling, Ann Howard (Kate), Francis Egerton and Robert Lloyd, with direction by Peter Coe and choreography by Sheila O'Neill. Coe did a translation for British audiences, including having "a tea wagon", and included "traditional English music hall jokes". This revival had a "brief run", according to the Encyclopedia of the Musical Theatre.

The Royal Shakespeare Company staged a production which opened at the Royal Shakespeare Theatre, Stratford-upon-Avon, on February 10, 1987, toured the UK from March to May, and then played at London's Old Vic Theatre from May 19, 1987. Directed by Adrian Noble and staged by Ron Field, the production starred Nichola McAuliffe and Paul Jones as Lilli/Kate and Fred/Petruchio, with Tim Flavin and Fiona Hendley as Bill/Lucentio and Lois/Bianca. The gangsters were played by Emil Wolk and John Bardon, who shared the 1987 Olivier Award for Outstanding Performance of the Year by an Actor in a Musical, while McAuliffe won the Olivier for Outstanding Performance of the Year by an Actress in a Musical. The production moved to the Savoy Theatre on January 15, 1988, with a new cast.

1952 and 1999 Broadway revivals
A short-lived Broadway revival ran at the Broadway Theatre in January 1952. It was directed by John C. Wilson and choreographed by Hanya Holm. Holly Harris and Robert Wright starred as Lilli and Fred.

A Broadway revival opened at the Martin Beck Theatre on November 18, 1999, and closed on December 30, 2001, after 881 performances and 28 previews. Directed by Michael Blakemore, Produced by Richard Godwin, and choreographed by Kathleen Marshall and Rob Ashford, the opening night cast included Marin Mazzie, Brian Stokes Mitchell, Amy Spanger, Michael Berresse, Ron Holgate, Lee Wilkof and Michael Mulheren. This production won the Tony Awards for Best Revival of a Musical and Best Actor in a Musical for Mitchell; Marin Mazzie received a Tony nomination for Best Actress in a Musical, and Michael Berresse, Lee Wilkof and Michael Mulheren received Tony nominations for Best Featured Actor in a Musical.

2001 and 2012 London revivals
A West End revival opened at the Victoria Palace Theatre on October 30, 2001, and closed on August 24, 2002. As with the 1999 Broadway revival, Michael Blakemore was the director with choreography by Kathleen Marshall. Brent Barrett and Marin Mazzie co-starred.

Chichester Festival Theatre's 2012 revival of the show transferred to the Old Vic Theatre on London's South Bank in November 2012, with an official opening in December. It starred Hannah Waddingham as Lili/Kate and Alex Bourne as Fred Graham. The production was directed by Trevor Nunn. The show received positive reviews from critics and audiences. Hannah Waddingham and Alex Bourne were both nominated for the 2013 Olivier Awards as Best Actress/Actor in a Musical for their performances.

2015 Opera North production 
In September 2015 Opera North presented a revival directed by Jo Davies, choreographed by Will Tuckett. The production opened at the Leeds Grand Theatre before touring to Theatre Royal Newcastle, The Lowry Salford, and Theatre Royal Nottingham. The production was co-produced with Welsh National Opera who continued to tour it in 2016, first as part of the Shakespeare400 season at the Wales Millennium Centre, Cardiff, and then to Liverpool Empire Theatre, Bristol Hippodrome, New Theatre Oxford, Mayflower Theatre Southampton, Birmingham Hippodrome, and Venue Cymru Llandudno, before returning to Cardiff. The production was revived at London Coliseum briefly in June 2018, following a return visit to Leeds Grand Theatre in May 2018.

2019 Broadway revival 
The Roundabout Theatre Company presented a revised third Broadway revival of Kiss Me, Kate with Kelli O'Hara as Lilli Vanessi/Kate, Will Chase as Fred Graham/Petruchio, Stephanie Styles as Lois Lane/Bianca, and Corbin Bleu as Bill Calhoun/Lucentio. The production is directed by Scott Ellis and choreographed by Warren Carlyle, with minor "feminist" updates by Amanda Green to make the musical "more accessible for today’s audiences". Roundabout produced a benefit concert of the show with O'Hara, Ellis, and Carlyle in 2016. The revival had a limited run at Studio 54. Previews began on February 14, 2019, with the opening on March 14. The production closed on June 30, 2019.

Casts

Plot
Act I

The cast of a musical version of William Shakespeare's The Taming of the Shrew is rehearsing for the opening of the show that evening ("Another Op'nin', Another Show"). Egotistical Fred Graham is the director and producer and is starring as Petruchio, and his movie-star ex-wife, Lilli Vanessi, is playing Katherine. The two seem to be constantly arguing, and Lilli is particularly angry that Fred is pursuing the sexy young actress Lois Lane, who is playing Bianca. After the rehearsal, Lois's boyfriend Bill appears; he is playing Lucentio, but he missed the rehearsal because he was gambling. He tells her that he signed a $10,000 IOU in Fred's name, and Lois reprimands him ("Why Can't You Behave?").

Before the opening, Fred and Lilli meet backstage, and Lilli shows off her engagement ring from Washington insider Harrison Howell, reminding Fred that it's the anniversary of their divorce. They recall the operetta in which they met, which included "Wunderbar", a Viennese waltz; they end up fondly reminiscing and singing and dancing. Two gangsters show up to collect the $10,000 IOU, and Fred replies that he never signed it. The gangsters obligingly say they will give him time to remember it and will return later. In her dressing room, Lilli receives flowers from Fred, and she declares that she is still "So In Love" with him. Fred tries to keep Lilli from reading the card that came with the flowers, which reveals that he really intended them for Lois. However, Lilli takes the card with her onstage, saying she will read it later.

The show begins ("We Open in Venice"). Baptista, Katherine and Bianca's father, will not allow his younger daughter Bianca to marry until his older daughter Katherine is married. However, she is shrewish and ill-tempered, and no man desires to marry her. Three suitors – Lucentio, Hortensio, and Gremio – try to woo Bianca, and she says that she would marry any of them ("Tom, Dick, or Harry"). Petruchio, a friend of Lucentio, expresses a desire to marry into wealth ("I've Come to Wive it Wealthily in Padua"). The suitors hatch a plan for him to marry Kate, as Baptista is rich. Kate, however, has no intentions of getting married ("I Hate Men"). Petruchio attempts to woo her ("Were Thine That Special Face"). Offstage, Lilli has an opportunity to read the card. She walks on stage off-cue and begins hitting Fred, who, along with the other actors, tries to remain in character as Baptista gives Petruchio permission to marry Kate. Lilli continues to strike Fred, and he ends up spanking her. Offstage, Lilli furiously declares she is leaving the show. However, the gangsters have reappeared, and Fred tells them that if Lilli quits, he'll have to close the show and won't be able to pay them the $10,000. The gangsters force her to stay at gunpoint. Back onstage, Bianca and Lucentio dance while the chorus performs "We Sing of Love", covering a scene change. The curtain opens, revealing the exterior of a church; Petruchio and Kate have just been married, and they exit the church; the gangsters, dressed in Shakespearean costume, are onstage to make sure that Lilli stays. Petruchio implores for Kate to kiss him, and she refuses. He lifts her over his shoulder and carries her offstage while she pummels his shoulder with her fists ("Kiss Me Kate").

Act II

During the show's intermission, the cast and crew relax in the alley behind the theater. Paul (Fred's assistant), along with a couple other crew members, lament that it's "Too Darn Hot" to meet their lovers that night. The play continues, and Petruchio tries to 'tame' Katherine and mourns for his now-lost bachelor life ("Where Is the Life That Late I Led?"). Off-stage, Lilli's fiancé Harrison Howell is looking for Lilli. He runs into Lois, and she recognizes him as a former lover but promises not to tell Lilli. Bill is shocked to overhear this, but Lois tells him that even if she is involved with other men, she is faithful to him in her own way ("Always True to You in My Fashion"). Lilli tries to explain to Howell that she is being forced to stay at the theatre by the gangsters, but Howell doesn't believe her and wants to discuss wedding plans. Fred insidiously points out how boring Lilli's life with Howell will be compared with the theatre. Bill sings a love song he has written for Lois ("Bianca").

The gangsters discover that their boss has been killed, so the IOU is no longer valid. Lilli leaves—without Howell—as Fred unsuccessfully tries to persuade her to stay ("So in Love" (Reprise)). The gangsters get caught on stage and improvise a tribute to Shakespeare in which they explain that knowing Shakespeare is the key to romance ("Brush Up Your Shakespeare"). The company prepares for the conclusion of the play, the wedding of Bianca and Lucentio, even though they are now missing one of the main characters. However, just in time for Katherine's final speech, Lilli arrives onstage ("I Am Ashamed That Women Are So Simple"). Fred and Lilli wordlessly reconcile on stage, and the play ends ("Kiss Me Kate" (Finale)) with them, as well as Bill and Lois, kissing passionately.

Song list

Act I
 "Another Op'nin', Another Show" – Hattie and Company
 "Why Can't You Behave?" – Lois Lane and Bill Calhoun
 "Wunderbar" – Fred Graham and Lilli Vanessi
 "So in Love" – Lilli Vanessi
 "We Open in Venice" – Fred Graham, Lilli Vanessi, Lois Lane and Bill Calhoun
 "Tom, Dick or Harry" – Bianca, Lucentio, Gremio and Hortensio
 "I've Come to Wive it Wealthily in Padua" – Fred Graham and The Men
 "I Hate Men" – Lilli Vanessi
 "Were Thine That Special Face" – Fred Graham
 "We Sing of Love (Cantiamo D'Amore)" – Lois Lane, Bill Calhoun and Ensemble
 "Kiss Me, Kate" – Fred Graham, Lili Vanessi and Ensemble

Act II
 "Too Darn Hot" – Paul and Ensemble
 "Where is the Life That Late I Led?" – Fred Graham
 "Always True to You in My Fashion" – Lois Lane
 "From This Moment On" – Harrison Howell and Lilli Vanessi
 "Bianca" – Bill Calhoun and Company
 "So in Love" (Reprise) – Fred Graham
 "Brush Up Your Shakespeare" – First Gangster and Second Gangster
 "I Am Ashamed That Women Are So Simple" – Lilli Vanessi
 "Kiss Me, Kate" (Reprise = Finale) – Company

Notes
In 1998, the original cast recording of the 1948 Broadway production was inducted into the Grammy Hall of Fame.
For the 1999 revival, "From This Moment On", originally from Porter's 1951 musical Out of This World, was added to Act II between "Always True to You in My Fashion" and "Bianca"; this song had been added to the 1953 film version of Kiss Me Kate.
For the 2019 revival, "I Am Ashamed That Women Are So Simple" was changed to "I Am Ashamed That People Are So Simple."

Film and television
A film version of the same name was released in 1953. There have been at least four television productions, the first on Hallmark Hall of Fame in 1958, with Drake and Morison reprising their Broadway roles, the second recorded for the launch of BBC Two in the UK in 1964, starring Howard Keel, Patricia Morison and Millicent Martin, the third in 1968 with then husband-and-wife team Robert Goulet and Carol Lawrence, and the fourth in 2003 on Great Performances, a high-definition shot performance of the London revival with Brent Barrett and Rachel York.

Awards and nominations

Original Broadway production

1987 Royal Shakespeare Company UK revival

1999 Broadway revival

2001 London revival

2012 London revival

2019 Broadway revival

Notes

References
McBrien, William (2000). Cole Porter. Reprint edition. New York: Knopf. 
Stempel, Larry (2010). Showtime: A History of the Broadway Musical Theater. New York: W.W. Norton and Company. 
Information from the TamsWitmark website
Information from the Imagination website

External links

Porter information
PBS article
Review of original Broadway production at Variety
2014 Critical Edition Orchestral score, Vocal score

Musicals by Cole Porter
1948 musicals
Broadway musicals
Drama Desk Award-winning musicals
Modern adaptations of works by William Shakespeare
Plays and musicals based on The Taming of the Shrew
West End musicals
Grammy Hall of Fame Award recipients
United States National Recording Registry recordings
American plays adapted into films
Tony Award for Best Musical
Tony Award-winning musicals
Backstage musicals